The Batetela rebellion was a series of three military mutinies and a subsequent low-level insurgency which was attributed to members of the Tetela ethnic group in the Congo Free State between 1895 and 1908. Beginning in a mutiny among the troops the Force Publique of Luluabourg (modern-day Kananga) in January 1895, the revolt sparked an prolonged insurgency and two further mutinies elsewhere in the Congo. The rebellion was one of the most important anti-colonial rebellions in the history of the Congo and the last Tetela rebels were only defeated in 1901.

Mutinies

The Batetela rebellion usually refers to three separate military mutinies in the Force Publique:
1895: mutiny in the garrison of Luluabourg (modern-day Kananga);
1897: mutiny among the troops under Francis Dhanis on an expedition to the Upper Nile;
1900: mutiny among the garrison of Fort de Shinkakasa near Boma.

The Force Publique recruited heavily from the Tetela ethnic group in the Sankuru, Maniema and Lomami regions, especially during the Congo–Arab War (1892–94). In January 1895, the garrison of Luluabourg mutinied in response to the execution of the warlord Gongo Lutete for treachery during the war against the Arabs. In October 1896, there were approximately 3–4,000 Batetela rebels. The mutineers killed one of their white officers and escaped, being joined by Tetela soldiers from across the colony over the coming years.

In 1897, 1,300 troops from the Tetela and Kusu ethnic groups in an expeditionary force sent to the Upper Nile under the command of Baron Francis Dhanis mutinied, complaining of poor treatment. The force, the largest military force assembled in colonial Africa up to that point, had been sent to annex the Fashoda (now Kodok) region in modern-day South Sudan and the expedition's collapse as a result of the mutiny meant that the Congo Free State would ultimately avoid becoming a party in the Fashoda Incident. The mutineers killed 10 Belgian officers and took a French priest hostage, though he was ultimately released unharmed.

The third rebellion broke out in the garrison of Fort de Shinkakasa on the Congo River on 17 April 1900. The rebels gained control of the fort and opened fire on a moored ship and threatened the safety of the colonial capital, Boma. Despite being repeatedly defeated, the last Tetela mutineers held out around Lake Kisale until 1901 or 1908. After the conflict the Belgians reformed the Force Publique so that no single ethnic group represented a majority in any given unit.

Footnotes

References

Bibliography

Further reading

Congo Free State
1890s in the Congo Free State
1900s in the Congo Free State
Wars involving the Democratic Republic of the Congo
Battles involving the Force Publique
Rebellions in Africa
African resistance to colonialism
Mahdist War
Conflicts in 1895
Conflicts in 1897
Conflicts in 1900